Witham is a town in the county of Essex in the East of England, with a population (2011 census) of 25,353. It is part of the District of Braintree and is twinned with the town of Waldbröl, Germany. Witham stands between the city of Chelmsford (8 miles to the south-west) and the City of Colchester (13 miles to the north-east), on the Roman road between the two. The River Brain runs through the town and joins the River Blackwater just outside.

History

Early history
Excavations by Essex County Council Field Archaeological unit at the recent Maltings Lane development discovered evidence of Neolithic occupation at Witham, including human remains and several trackways across ancient marsh. Excavations of the Witham Lodge (Ivy Chimneys) area of the town in the 1970s unveiled remains of a Roman temple as well as a pottery kiln. This would have been alongside the main Roman road from Colchester to London and used as a stopover point on the long journey. Another notable find during the excavation was a votive offering pool in the grounds of the temple, containing several artefacts that would have been offered to the gods.

In 913, according to the Anglo-Saxon Chronicle, Edward the Elder marched from Hertford to reconquer Essex, and encamped in Witham on his route to set up a base at Maldon. Witham's position on the Roman road in relation to the major Viking army based at Colchester was the most likely reason for this, and it would have effectively cut Essex in two.

The place-name Witham is first attested in the Anglo-Saxon Chronicle in 913 (mentioned above), where it appears as Witham. It also appears as Witham in the Domesday Book of 1086. The name may mean 'village in a bend'. Another suggestion is that the name is part Brythonic (probably from a cognate of Gwydd = "Woods" in modern Welsh) and "ham", a very common Saxon village designation.

The manor of Witham was given to the Knights Templar in 1148. To the north of the current town is Cressing Temple which was the earliest foundation of Templar lands in Britain, built over 700 years ago. His heirs held the manor for almost two centuries, until 1648 when the Southcott family had their lands destroyed for supporting the royalist cause in the English Civil War.

The town as it is now started life on 'Chipping Hill', which is the location of St Nicolas's Church. As the years went by, the hamlet grew to become 'Witham' and St Nicolas's Church of England Church (a unique spelling) serves a congregation of around 150 people each Sunday. During the latter half of the 18th century and the early 19th century, Admiral Sir William Luard was the town's most prominent citizen, a resident of Chipping Hill and a founder and patron of St Nicolas's Church. His funeral cortège through the town in 1910 was witnessed by thousands.

In the 18th century, Witham briefly enjoyed a period as an affluent spa town after the discovery of a mineral-bearing spa by a Dr Taverner. Witham was also a centre of the wool trade until the decline of the industry in the late 17th century.

Witham rail crash

Witham railway station was the scene of a serious accident  on 1 September 1905. The London Liverpool Street-to-Cromer 14-coach express derailed whilst travelling at speed through the station. Ten passengers and a luggage porter were killed when several of the carriages somersaulted on to the platforms causing considerable damage to the rolling stock and the station. Seventy-one passengers were seriously injured. It remains to this day the worst single loss of life in a railway accident in Essex.

In 2005, an opportunity to commemorate the centenary was missed and the incident is now largely forgotten. Ben Sainty, a signalman, whose quick action averted the next train hitting the wreckage, has a road named after him in the town, Ben Sainty Court.

20th and 21st centuries
The town expanded greatly in the late 1960s and 1970s, when the Greater London Council built three large council estates on the west and north sides of the town, and a smaller one to the south, for families from London to move to as part of the New Town and Expanded Town overspill policy of that time.

A famous one-time resident of the town was the author Dorothy L. Sayers, whose statue stands opposite the town's library, which is a short distance from the author's house. The library stands on the site of the old Whitehall cinema, which closed in the late 1970s and which was itself a conversion of the White Hall country house.

Witham has grown in size after the development of the Maltings Lane estate to the south of the town between 2002 and 2003. This was followed, in 2012, by the moving of Chipping Hill Primary School from its old premises in Church Street to a new-build in Owers Road. The development of this area has continued, including the opening of an Aldi superstore in 2015.

Approved developments in this period include the reconstruction of both the New Rickstones Academy and the Maltings Academy, completed in 2011; the Marston's pub and restaurant on Gershwin Boulevard, completed in 2013 with the adjacent Seymour House day nursery; the refurbishment and opening of a Morrisons store in the old premises of the Jack & Jenny pub in 2014; and the newly-built Witham Leisure Centre on Spinks Lane, replacing Bramston Sports Centre, completed in 2014.

Transport
The town is served by Witham railway station, situated on the Great Eastern Main Line operated by Abellio Greater Anglia. Trains take approximately 40–45 minutes to reach . The station is also the junction for a branch line to Braintree. Another branch line went from Witham to Maldon, but this has now been dismantled having been closed to passengers in 1964.

Witham is situated on the A12 trunk road between Chelmsford and Colchester, which was originally a Roman road from London to Colchester. The A12 used to run in a straight line through the middle of the town, but a by-pass now completely avoids the town.

Witham is on National Cycle Route 16.

The town has a large number of residents who commute to work in London because of its excellent transport links. This is evident by Witham railway station's appearance within the 150 busiest railway stations in Great Britain, which would not be expected based on the town's population alone.

Economy and facilities
Witham has a mainly linear town centre, focused on the high street and two shopping precincts to form a cross that bisects the high street; these are the Newlands Shopping Centre of 1970s design to the north and the Grove Centre of a 1980s brick design to the south. There are also a range of small shops, restaurants, pubs, major high-street banks and several national commercial chains. The town also has five supermarkets: Tesco in the Grove Centre, Morrisons near the railway station, Asda on Highfields Road, Aldi at the southern entrance to the town and Lidl that recently opened towards the centre of town on the old Bramston sports centre site.

A significant industrial presence remains in the town, concentrated on three industrial estates on the eastern side of the town close to the junction with the A12. There are also commercial offices located in the town centre area.

In March 2007, Crittall Windows closed its Braintree factory and returned to Witham to occupy a new factory on the Freebournes Industrial Estate. The factory Crittall moved into was built for J.L. French in 2001, but never used for production. The new Crittall factory is visible on the right hand side of the road exiting Witham towards Colchester, via the A12.

In December 2013, the financial service provider Cofunds relocated to the former Marsh building on the Grove, bringing approximately 600 jobs to the town.

Sport and leisure

Witham has a Non-League football club Witham Town F.C. who play at Spa Road.

There is also a rugby club situated behind the football ground.

Witham also has a hockey club formed in 1924 and is now made up of 5 men's teams and 3 women's teams. Witham also participates in the local mixed league as well as the men's and women's summer league and indoor league. Witham hockey club play on the astro turf across the road from Maltings Academy on Spinks Lane. The hockey club share a clubhouse with the cricket club which is situated next to the recreation ground, commonly known as the Maldon Road Park, on Maldon Road.

Leisure facilities include Benton Hall Golf and Country Club, a pool club, and a library which occupies the site of what was the town's long-closed cinema, the Whitehall. A 'River Walk' runs for three-and-a-half miles through the town and is home to a range of wildlife. Witham Leisure Centre is located in Spinks Lane, adjacent to the former Bramston Sports Centre.

Education
There are two secondary schools in Witham, Maltings Academy and New Rickstones Academy. Maltings Academy achieved 94% A*- C GCSE grades in 2012. (51% including English and Maths) and an above national average of 99% of pupils gaining at least one GCSE in 2012. The two schools are part of the AET Academies chain. New Rickstones Academy was rated Good by Ofsted in January 2015 and Maltings Academy was rated Outstanding by Ofsted in March 2015.

The town's primary schools are Templars, Holy Family Catholic School, Howbridge, Powers Hall, Chipping Hill (which became a primary school in September 2010), Rivenhall CoE, Elm Hall Primary, Southview, and Silver End Primary. Both Chipping Hill School and Powers Hall Junior School received Outstanding OfSTED reports in 2008.Chipping Hill was named the Top School in East Anglia by the Sunday Times. 

The Chatten free school is a special educational needs school which opened in 2021. The school provides up to 75 places to pupils from across Essex with severe, complex autism.

Governance
Witham is part of the Witham constituency of the House of Commons. The local Member of Parliament (MP) is the Conservative Home Secretary Priti Patel, who was elected at the 2010 general election, becoming the first Asian female Conservative MP. Ms Patel was re-elected at the 2015 general election with an increased majority and again in the 2019 general election.

The constituency includes Hatfield Peverel, Langford, Wickham Bishops, Marks Tey, Tiptree, Tolleshunt Knights, Stanway Kelvedon, and Coggeshall. It is regarded as one of the safest seats for the Conservative Party, and Priti Patel holds a strong 15,196 vote majority. Over 66% of the votes in the 2019 general election went to Ms Patel.

Witham is under the jurisdiction of Witham Town Council (its parish council), Braintree District Council and Essex County Council. Witham Town Council is based at Witham Town Hall.

Witham, and parts of the Braintree district, hold one of the best recycling schemes in the UK, with compulsory recycling, reaching over 50% recycling.

Notable residents
Archibald Douglas, Lt-General and 18th-century MP lived in White Hall.
James Gibson, the 2003 World Breaststroke 50m (Long-course) Champion, was born in Chelmsford and lived in Witham.
Dorothy L. Sayers, translator of Dante's Divina Commedia, and a famous writer of detective fiction, died in Witham in 1957.
 Admiral Sir William Luard, K.C., President of the Greenwich Naval College and Admiral of the Fleet.
John Strutt, 3rd Baron Rayleigh, Nobel Prize–winning physicist for the discovery of argon, died in 1919 at Terling Place, Witham.
James Winslow, Australian and Asian Formula 3 champion lived in Witham before moving to Australia and then the US to race in Formula Atlantic.
Graham Hedman, 2006 European Champion, 4 × 400 men's relay, was born in Witham.
Nadine Lewington who appeared in Holby City between 2007 and 2009 lived in Witham.
Cody McDonald former Witham Town player, who eventually moved to Norwich City F.C. and then Coventry City F.C.
Olly Murs, singer, television presenter, current The Voice UK coach

References

External links

 Witham Town Council

 
Towns in Essex
Civil parishes in Essex
Braintree District